Presidential elections were held for the first time in Armenia on 17 October 1991. The result was a victory for Levon Ter-Petrosyan, who won 83% of  the vote. Turnout was 70%.

Results
Zori Balayan withdrew before election day, but remained on the ballot.

References

Armenia
Presidential elections in Armenia
1991 in Armenia
1990s in Armenian politics
Election and referendum articles with incomplete results